The Yelverton National Park is a national park in the South West region of Western Australia,  south of Perth.

The creation of this park out of two reserves, namely a  former timber reserve and a  crown reserve for water was proposed under the Regional Forest Agreement for the South-West Forest in May 1999 and implemented under the Forrest Management Plan (2004–2013). In 2004, the area was declared a national park. It was protected due to its high concentration of rare and priority species and its diverse range of vegetation types. There are no visitor facilities in the park.

References

External links
 Official website

National parks of Western Australia
Capes region of South West Western Australia
Protected areas established in 2004
2004 establishments in Australia
Jarrah Forest